Gaua Airport  is an airport on the island of Gaua, one of the Banks Islands in the Torba province in Vanuatu.

Airlines and destinations

References

External links

 

Airports in Vanuatu
Torba Province